"I Should Have Married You" is a song recorded by American country music artist Eddie Rabbitt and released in 1975 as the third and final single from his self-titled debut album. The song was written by Rabbitt and Even Stevens, and produced by David Malloy. It was Rabbitt's third country hit, reaching number 11 on the Billboard Hot Country Singles & Tracks chart.

Critical reception
On its release as a single, Cash Box noted the song's "strong lyric" and Malloy's "fine production".

Charts

References

1975 singles
1975 songs
Eddie Rabbitt songs
Songs written by Eddie Rabbitt
Songs written by Even Stevens (songwriter)
Song recordings produced by David Malloy
Elektra Records singles